Endre A. Vadnay (August 3, 1902 – December 3, 1969) was a writer for television and owner-editor of the Budapest newspaper Reggeli Vjsag.  Vadnay was born in Budapest, and left Hungary after the Hungarian Revolution of 1956.  He did work for Radio Free Europe.  He was nominated for an Emmy in 1958 for "War Against Wars" which was made for Bell television (AT&T).   He founded the Hungarian Theater in New York in 1958.  He died in New Jersey on December 3, 1969, at age 67.

References

1902 births
1969 deaths
People from Budapest